Condemned to Live is a 1935 American horror film starring Ralph Morgan and Maxine Doyle, and directed by Frank R. Strayer. The film is unusual for its time, as it approaches the topic of vampirism from a sympathetic standpoint and presents it as if it were an illness.

Plot

The film opens with a trio of explorers in Africa who are hiding in a cave. One of the explorers, a pregnant woman, is bitten by a vampire bat.

The film then cuts forward in time to a small European village where a series of mysterious murders are taking place. The villagers readily assemble in mob form, with torches, at the house of Professor Kristan (Ralph Morgan) after every murder. The villagers suspect that a giant bat is to blame for the murders. Kristan gives the villagers advice on staying safe, and assures them a scientific explanation exists.

However, in subsequent scenes, Kristan himself is revealed to be the murderer. He is seized by attacks (triggered by darkness) which transform him into a trance-like state of murderousness. After he commits a murder, he awakens from the trance with no memory of the deed, believing himself merely to have fainted.  Kristan's obliviousness is further enabled by the intervention of his loyal hunchback Zan, the only person aware of Kristan's condition. Zan follows Kristan when he is in his trances, ensuring the professor is not discovered.

An old friend of Kristan's, Dr. Bizet, arrives to visit, and soon suspects what is happening. Bizet discloses to Kristan that his mother was bitten by a vampire bat, and that traits of vampirism have likely been passed down to him per Lamarckism (the audience now understands the pregnant explorer in the opening flashback to have been Kristan's mother).

After Kristan's fiancé (Maxine Doyle) is attacked by an entranced Kristan, the mob of villagers assumes Zan is culpable and chases him to the edge of a cliff inside a cave. Kristan arrives and confesses to the murders, despite Zan's protestations (aimed at saving the professor) that he, the hunchback, is in fact the murderer.  As the mob watches, Kristan throws himself over the edge of the cliff and Zan follows.

Cast
 Ralph Morgan
 Pedro de Cordoba
 Maxine Doyle
 Russell Gleason
 Mischa Auer
 Lucy Beaumont
 Carl Stockdale
 Barbara Bedford
 Robert Frazer
 Ferdinand Schumann-Heink
 Heidi Shope
 Marilyn Knowlden

Memorable Quotes
"What good can there be in a hunchback?"  - Mob member

"Why do they come on me?" -Prof. Paul Kristan

"Over there on the bench." - Mother Molly

"We can never be afraid of what we love." -Prof. Paul Kristan

"I'll show you my garden if you wish." -Marguerite

"If we love our brother, how can we fear him?" -Prof. Paul Kristan

"It was kind of you to blow it out." -Prof. Paul Kristan

Notes

References
http://www.missinglinkclassichorror.co.uk/demned.htm
http://www.imdb.com/title/tt0026230/
https://web.archive.org/web/20070928000942/http://www.scifilm.org/musings/musing55.html

External links

 
 
 
 
 

1935 horror films
1935 films
American black-and-white films
Films directed by Frank R. Strayer
American vampire films
Chesterfield Pictures films
American horror films
1930s English-language films
1930s American films